Dennis Wayne's Dancers was a New York based contemporary ballet company founded around dancer Dennis Wayne by Paul Newman and Joanne Woodward. Formed in the summer of 1975 after Wayne left the American Ballet Theatre, the contemporary ballet company drew on the talents of many famous dancers and received critical acclaim. The dancers came from a variety of different companies, including Joffrey Ballet and American Ballet Theatre. Known for their virtuosic skill, the company performed both ballet and modern dance works. Dennis Wayne’s Dancers presented diverse programs with pieces by a variety of choreographers; though he also presented work he choreographed himself. Dennis Wayne also danced with the Company, but did not begin appearing with them until 1986.

The original Company was disbanded in 1980 after Dennis Wayne suffered injuries in a car accident and was unable to perform. However, the company was reorganized in 1981 and received great critical acclaim. The Company toured widely, performing internationally in 64 countries. They also performed at various acclaimed venues in the United States including Jacob's Pillow Dance Festival where the Company made its world debut. In 1989 the Company disbanded after nine years.

References

External links 
 Archive film of Dennis Wayne's Dancers performing Etudes aux Objets in 1977 at Jacob's Pillow

Contemporary dance companies